James H. Osmer (January 23, 1832 – October 3, 1912) was a Republican member of the U.S. House of Representatives from Pennsylvania.

James H. Osmer was born in Tenterden, Kent, England.

As an infant his parents immigrated to the United States and settled near Bellefonte, Pennsylvania. He attended private schools, Bellefonte Academy in Centre County, Pennsylvania, Mount Pleasant College in Westmoreland County, Pennsylvania, and Pennsylvania and Dickinson Seminary in Williamsport, Pennsylvania.

He studied law at Elmira, New York. He was admitted to the bar of the supreme court of New York at Cortland, New York, in 1858 and practiced at Horseheads, New York, near Elmira, until 1865, when he moved to Franklin, Pennsylvania, where he was admitted to the bar and practiced.  He was a delegate to the 1876 Republican National Convention. He was a delegate to several State conventions.

Osmer was elected as a Republican to the Forty-sixth Congress. He was not a candidate for renomination in 1880. He continued the practice of his profession in Franklin until his death in 1912, aged 80.  He was interred in Franklin Cemetery.

Sources

The Political Graveyard

1832 births
1912 deaths
British emigrants to the United States
Pennsylvania lawyers
People from Tenterden
Republican Party members of the United States House of Representatives from Pennsylvania
19th-century American politicians
19th-century American lawyers